Harry Wilkinson may refer to:
Harry Wilkinson (footballer, born 1883) (1883–?), English footballer
Harry Wilkinson (footballer, born 1926), English footballer
Harry Wilkinson (rugby) (1864–1942), rugby union footballer of the 1880s for England and Halifax
Harry Wilkinson (rugby league), rugby league footballer of the 1920s, 1930s and 1940s
Harry Wilkinson (rugby union) (1903–1988), rugby union footballer of the 1920s and 1930s for England and Halifax

See also
Harry Wilkinson Moore (1850–1915), English architect
Henry Wilkinson (disambiguation)
Harold Wilkinson (disambiguation)